Night eating syndrome (NES) is an eating disorder, characterized by a delayed circadian pattern of food intake. Although there is some degree of comorbidity with binge eating disorder, it differs from binge eating in that the amount of food consumed in the night is not necessarily objectively large nor is a loss of control over food intake required. It was originally described by Albert Stunkard in 1955 and is currently included in the other specified feeding or eating disorder category of the DSM-5.  Research diagnostic criteria have been proposed and include evening hyperphagia (consumption of 25% or more of the total daily calories after the evening meal) and/or nocturnal awakening and ingestion of food two or more times per week.  The person must have awareness of the night eating to differentiate it from the parasomnia sleep-related eating disorder (SRED).  Three of five associated symptoms must also be present: lack of appetite in the morning, urges to eat at night, belief that one must eat in order to fall back to sleep at night, depressed mood, and/or difficulty sleeping.

NES affects both men and women, between 1 and 2% of the general population, and approximately 10% of obese individuals.  The age of onset is typically in early adulthood (spanning from late teenage years to late twenties) and is often long-lasting, with children rarely reporting NES.  People with NES have been shown to have higher scores for depression and low self-esteem, and it has been demonstrated that nocturnal levels of the hormones melatonin and leptin are decreased.  The relationship between NES and the parasomnia SRED is in need of further clarification.  There is debate as to whether these should be viewed as separate diseases, or part of a continuum. Consuming foods containing serotonin has been suggested to aid in the treatment of NES, but other research indicates that diet by itself cannot appreciably raise serotonin levels in the brain. A few foods (for example, bananas) contain serotonin, but they do not affect brain serotonin levels, and various foods contain tryptophan, but the extent to which they affect brain serotonin levels must be further explored scientifically before conclusions can be drawn, and "the idea, common in popular culture, that a high-protein food such as turkey will raise brain tryptophan and serotonin is, unfortunately, false."

Presentation

Comorbidities
NES is sometimes comorbid with excess weight; as many as 28% of individuals seeking gastric bypass surgery were found to have NES in one study.  However, not all individuals with NES are overweight.  Night eating has been associated with diabetic complications.  Many people with NES also experience depressed mood and anxiety disorders.

See also
Nocturnal sleep related eating disorder

References

External links 

Parasomnias
Eating disorders
Syndromes